A fugue is a type of musical composition.

Fugue may also refer to:

 Fugue (film), a 2018 Polish film
 Fugue (hash function), a cryptographic hash function
 Fugue (magazine), an American literary journal
 Fugues (magazine), a Canadian gay-interest magazine
 The Fugue (foaled 2009), a British Thoroughbred racehorse
 Fugue state, a psychological term
 Fugue State Press, a small New York City literary publisher
 Fuging tune, a variety of Anglo-American vernacular choral music
 "Fugue", an instrumental by The Dillinger Escape Plan from Dissociation
 "Fugue", a song by Emerson, Lake & Palmer from Trilogy
 Füge, the Hungarian name for Figa village, Beclean town, Bistriţa-Năsăud County, Romania
 Fuge or Feudge, a surname found in England
 Dr. Frederique Fugue, a fictional character from the children's animated series Arthur

See also
 :Category:Fugues
 Fugu (disambiguation)